"Pick Me Up" is a song recorded by American country music singer Gabby Barrett. It serves as the fourth single from her debut album Goldmine. Barrett co-wrote the song with Jon Nite and Ross Copperman. The official music video for the song premiered on May 5, 2022.

Background
On November 19, 2021, Barrett released the deluxe edition to her debut album Goldmine. The song is one of four new tracks added to the extended version and serves as the fourth single. In a press release by Warner Music Nashville, Barrett said that she did not really have a song in her repertoire that was laid-back-Country – "a riding down the backroads while listening to George Strait-type of song."

Critical reception
Jess from Taste of Country said that the song is "both nostalgic and comforting. Like most backroad songs, it feels as if the song itself is taking the wheel and we're all just along for the ride." Chad Carlson from Today's Country Magazine praised the song and said that it "will undoubtedly be another hit for Gabby, as it showcases her vocal range and flexibility, while touching home on a familiar topic but adding her own spice and flavor that only she can do."

Music video
Directed by Alexa Campbell and featuring Barrett's husband, Cade Foehner, the video showcases the journey of a couple as young adults to their elderly years. The country singer admits that she cried once she saw the music video for the first time. "This one just touches my heart in a very special way."

Charts

Weekly charts

Year-end charts

Certifications

References

2020 songs
2021 singles
Gabby Barrett songs
Songs written by Gabby Barrett
Songs written by Ross Copperman
Songs written by Jon Nite
Song recordings produced by Ross Copperman
Warner Records Nashville singles